Clausurae is a modern term used by scholars to define short cut-off walls erected in order to block narrow defiles, mountain passes, and other similar passages.

References

Roman fortifications